WLVT-TV, virtual channel 39 (VHF digital channel 9), is a PBS member television station licensed to Allentown, Pennsylvania.

Owned by the Lehigh Valley Public Telecommunications Corporation, it is a sister station to Philadelphia-licensed PBS member station WPPT (channel 35). WLVT-TV's studios are located in the south side of Bethlehem, and its transmitter is located south of nearby Allentown atop South Mountain.

Overview
The station first signed on the air on September 7, 1965 as a member station of National Educational Television (NET), and eventually joined PBS at its inception in 1970. WLVT-TV is commonly known as PBS39, referring to the main virtual channel of 39.1.

The Lehigh Valley is part of the Philadelphia market; ranked as the fourth-largest market in the United States. In recent years, WLVT has expanded its programming focus to the entire Philadelphia television market. It is carried by many cable providers in the area, including Comcast, Service Electric, RCN, Blue Ridge Cable and others. WLVT-TV is also available throughout the region on the Philadelphia DirecTV and Dish Network feeds.

While this gives WLVT one of the largest potential audiences in the country–6.7 million people in eastern Pennsylvania, western and southern New Jersey and northern and central Delaware–the station's focus on the broader market means that it frequently competes with Philadelphia's main PBS member station, WHYY-TV (channel 12). To a lesser extent, it also competes with NJ PBS's two repeaters in the market, WNJT and WNJS.

In 2011, WLVT-TV moved from its longtime studio on Mountain Drive North to a new studio facility, the PPL Public Media Center, on the south side of Bethlehem. The new facility is adjacent to the ArtsQuest complex on the SteelStacks Campus, previously home to the Bethlehem Steel Corporation. The new station, equipped with two large studios, holds many local productions including Focus (a local magazine show), You Bet Your Garden (formerly on WHYY-FM),Scholastic Scrimmage, Faces of Jazz, and Behind the Guitar. WLVT also broadcasts airings of programming distributed by PBS, American Public Television, and other distributors.

Digital television

Digital channels
The station's digital signal is multiplexed:

Analog-to-digital conversion
WLVT shut down its analog signal, over UHF channel 39, on January 31, 2009. The station's digital signal relocated on its pre-transition UHF channel 62, which was among the high band UHF channels (52-69) that were removed from broadcasting use as a result of the transition, to its former analog-era UHF channel 39 for post-transition operations.

See also
Media in the Lehigh Valley

References

External links
Official website

LVT-TV
PBS member stations
Television channels and stations established in 1965
Mass media in Allentown, Pennsylvania
LVT-TV
1965 establishments in Pennsylvania